Todd Hanson is an American writer and voice actor, notable for his work as a writer and editor at the parody newspaper The Onion. He also voices the character Dan Halen on the Adult Swim program Squidbillies.

Career

As writer
Todd Hanson briefly attended the University of Wisconsin-Madison in 1986 and soon dropped out.  He remained in Madison and began working a series of menial jobs. Eventually Hanson began drawing a semi-autobiographical cartoon entitled 'Badgers and Other Animals' which was published regularly in the Daily Cardinal, a university student newspaper.  Hanson was working as a dishwasher when he first started as a writer and cartoonist at The Onion. He wrote an article in The Onion that was optioned as a movie by DreamWorks and co-wrote the comedy film The Onion Movie (2008), which he has since disowned.

As actor
Todd was an ensemble member in the Ark Improvisational Theater in Madison, Wisconsin from 1987–88. He voices the character Dan Halen on Squidbillies. He made three guest appearances in the episodes of Aqua Teen Hunger Force called Interfection, Hypno-Germ and Last Dance for Napkin Lad. He is also on the commentary for Aqua Teen Hunger Force Colon Movie Film for Theaters in which he stated that he is a big fan of the show. The commentary also states that he came up with the Chicken Bittle character which was rejected to be an Aqua Teen for several years.

Personal life
Hanson has lived in Wisconsin and New York City, New York. During a storytelling segment on Public Radio International's The Moth, Hanson credited his mother for him being "a douchebag".

Hanson spoke candidly about his long history of depression on the July 7, 2011 episode of WTF with Marc Maron.

Filmography

References

External links
 

Year of birth missing (living people)
Place of birth missing (living people)
20th-century American male actors
20th-century births
20th-century American writers
21st-century American male actors
21st-century American writers
American comedy writers
American cartoonists
American male screenwriters
American television writers
American male voice actors
Living people
The Onion people
Writers from Brooklyn
American male television writers
20th-century American male writers
Screenwriters from Wisconsin
Writers from Wisconsin